Padre Burgos may refer to:
José Burgos, a martyred Filipino Catholic priest
Padre Burgos Avenue, a road in Manila, Philippines
Padre Burgos, Quezon, Philippines
Padre Burgos, Southern Leyte, Philippines
Padre Burgos, a 1949 biographical film directed by Gerardo de León